The Division of Mallee is an Australian Electoral Division in the state of Victoria. It is located in the far north-west of the state, adjoining the border with South Australia in the west, and the Murray River (which forms the border with New South Wales) in the north. At , it is the largest Division in Victoria. It includes the centres of Mildura, Ouyen, Swan Hill, St Arnaud, Warracknabeal, Stawell, Horsham and Maryborough.

Geography
Since 1984, federal electoral division boundaries in Australia have been determined at redistributions by a redistribution committee appointed by the Australian Electoral Commission. Redistributions occur for the boundaries of divisions in a particular state, and they occur every seven years, or sooner if a state's representation entitlement changes or when divisions of a state are malapportioned.

History

The division was proclaimed at the redistribution of 11 May 1949, and was first contested at the 1949 election. It was named after the Mallee region of Victoria, in which the division is located, which itself is named after the mallee variety of eucalyptus. Note that the division also includes the Wimmera region of Victoria, which is why the title of the sitting member's newsletter is Wimmera Mallee News.

Mallee has always been a safe Country/National seat. It was previously the safest Coalition seat in federal parliament and also previously  the safest seat in the entire parliament in the 2010 election, with a 24-point swing required for Labor to have won it. In the 2013 election, a Liberal Party candidate stood against the Country/National Party, making it a contest between Coalition parties.

Members

Election results

References

External links
 Division of Mallee - Australian Electoral Commission

Electoral divisions of Australia
Constituencies established in 1949
1949 establishments in Australia
Mallee (Victoria)
Swan Hill
Warracknabeal
Mildura
Maryborough, Victoria
Shire of Buloke
Shire of Central Goldfields
Shire of Gannawarra
Rural City of Horsham
Shire of Hindmarsh
Shire of Loddon
Shire of West Wimmera
Shire of Yarriambiack